The Ohio State Buckeyes college football team represents the Ohio State University in the East Division of the Big Ten Conference.  The Buckeyes compete as part of the NCAA Division I Football Bowl Subdivision.  The program has had 25 coaches since it began play during the 1890 season.  The Buckeyes have played over 1,200 games over 125 seasons. In those seasons, eight head coaches have led the Buckeyes to postseason bowl games: John Wilce, Wes Fesler, Woody Hayes, Earle Bruce, John Cooper, Jim Tressel, Luke Fickell, and Urban Meyer.  Twelve coaches have won conference championships with the Buckeyes: Albert Herrnstein, John Richards, Wilce, Francis Schmidt, Paul Brown, Carroll Widdoes, Fesler, Hayes, Bruce, Cooper, Tressel, Meyer, and Day.  Four coaches led Buckeyes to national championships: Brown, Hayes, Tressel, and Meyer. Hayes is the all-time leader in games coached and years coached with the Buckeyes, while also leading all coaches in victories (205). Meyer currently holds the highest winning percentage of all Buckeye coaches (.901), with a current record of 73–8 in six seasons. David Edwards holds the lowest winning percentage of any Buckeye head coach (.167), going 1–7–1 in the only season that he coached. Of the 24 Buckeye head coaches, Howard Jones, Wilce, Schmidt, Fesler, Hayes, Bruce, Cooper, and Tressel have been inducted into the College Football Hall of Fame.  The previous head coach of the Buckeyes was Urban Meyer who was hired in November 2011 and then announced December 4, 2018, he would retire following the Rose Bowl. Ryan Day then became the new coach of the Buckeyes.

Key

Coaches

Notes

References
General

 
 
<div>

Specific

Lists of college football head coaches
Ohio sports-related lists
Columbus, Ohio-related lists